Tony Okoroji is a Nigerian musician, singer, songwriter, record producer, author and intellectual property activist. He was elected President of Performing Musicians Association of Nigeria (PMAN) in 1989 and later became the Chairman of Copyright Society of Nigeria (COSON). In 2016, Okoroji established his own record label, TOPs Record.

Music industry leadership 
Okoroji became president of Performing Musicians Association of Nigeria (PMAN) in 1989. He is credited for expanding the organisation across Nigeria.

He was also one of the individuals that called for the establishment of Nigerian Copyright Commission (NCC) during military dictatorship. Okoroji emerged chairman of Copyright Society of Nigeria (COSON) following its formation in May 2010.

In 2017, he introduced Nigeria’s first online licensing platform, COSON Licensing Application Platform (CLAP) and declared an all-out war against copyright infringements. This reform led to the collection of 300 million naira royalty for artists within a year.

Books 
In 2009, Okoroji  released a book Copyright, Neighborhood Rights and the new Millionaires (the twists and turns in Nigeria) which analysed copyright infringement issues and ways to tackle the challenges.

In 2017, Okoroji published another book On The Road To Change which is a compendium of articles written by him and published in Saturday Independent (Nigerian Newspaper) and other media platforms.

Music career 
Okoroji became popular in the early 70s with hits such as James and John, I say No, and Oriaku from his Juliana album and Akataka. In 2016, he established his own record label, TOPs Record. In 2017, he released a single which is a remake of Oriaku  titled Oriaku newskul  and in 2018, he released another single, Happy Music  under his own record label.

Discography 
Juliana album (1983)

Akataka album (1985)

Locomotion album (1984)

Super Sure (1976)

Big Big Sugar Daddy 1979)
	
Mama & Papa (1982)
	
Akataka (1985)

Otanishi (1986)

Latest singles 
Happy music (single) 2017.

Oriaku (The New School) 2018

References 

Nigerian music industry executives
Nigerian male musicians
Living people
1957 births